Natalio Dixon Wheatley (born 2 June 1980) is a British Virgin Islands politician currently serving as Premier of the British Virgin Islands.  He is the grandson of former Chief Minister, Willard Wheatley. He has at times expressed a preference to be referred to by his adopted African name, Sowande Uhuru.

Political career 
Wheatley is from one of the main political families in the British Virgin Islands.

He first ran for election in the 2011 general election for the People's Patriotic Alliance (PPA) as an at-large candidate. He finished 10th in the voting with 798 votes (2.3%). He subsequently ran in the 2015 general election for the People's Empowerment Party (PEP), also as an at large candidate. He finished 11th in the voting with 470 votes (1.3%). He then ran in the 2019 general election for the Virgin Islands Party for the seventh district, and was elected after defeating incumbent Kedrick Pickering with 44.76% of the vote.

He was appointed Minister for Education, Culture, Youth Affairs, Fisheries and Agriculture from 2019. He was the acting Premier during the arrest of Andrew Fahie in April 2022 on drug trafficking and money laundering charges in Miami, United States. A Commission of Inquiry into corruption in the British Virgin Islands found that there were "appalling" failures in the islands' governance and a "high likelihood" of serious corruption, with the inquiry recommending the partial suspension of the islands’ constitution and the imposition of direct British rule of the islands for up to two years. He opposes direct rule from London during the crisis. On 5 May 2022, he brought a motion of no confidence against his own government for the removal of Andrew Fahie as Premier. The motion was passed unanimously. Wheatley was sworn in as Premier on the same day.

References 

1980 births
Living people
Alumni of SOAS University of London
British Virgin Islands politicians
Clark Atlanta University alumni
Members of the House of Assembly of the British Virgin Islands
Premiers of the British Virgin Islands
Purdue University alumni